The following is a list of governors and other local administrators of the city of Ceuta, a Spanish exclave in North Africa. The list encompass the period from 1415 until 1995.

List

Portuguese Captains-general

1415–1424: Pedro de Meneses, conde de Viana
1424–1425: Rui Gomes da Silva
1425–1430: Pedro de Meneses, conde de Vila Real
1430–1434: Duarte de Meneses, conde de Viana (interim)
1434–1437: Pedro de Meneses, conde de Vila Real
1437–1438: Duarte de Meneses, conde de Viana (interim)
1438–1445: Fernão de Noronha, conde de Vila Real
1445–1447: António Pacheco (interim)
1447–1448: Fernão de Portugal, duque de Bragança
1448: António Pacheco (interim)
1448–1450: Fernão de Portugal, duque de Bragança
1450–1460: Sancho de Noronha, conde de Odemira
1461–1462: Pedro de Meneses, conde de Vila Real
1462–1463: Pedro de Albuquerque (interim)
1463–1464: Pedro de Meneses, conde de Vila Real
1464–1479: João Rodrigues de Vasconcelos Ribeiro
1479–1481: Rui Mendes de Vasconcelos Ribeiro
1481–1487: João de Noronha, senhor de Sortelha
1487–1491: António de Noronha, conde de Linhares
1491–1509: Fernão de Meneses, conde de Alcoutim
1509–1512: Pedro Barbo Alardo
1512–1517: Pedro de Meneses, conde de Alcoutim
1518–1519: João da Silva, conde de Portalegre
1519–1521: Gomes da Silva de Vasconcelos
1522–1524: João de Noronha
1524–1525: Pedro de Meneses, conde de Alcoutim
1525–1529: Gomes da Silva de Vasconcelos
1529–1539: Nunho Álvares Pereira de Noronha
1540–1549: Afonso de Noronha
1549: Antão de Noronha
1549–1550: Martim Correia da Silva
1550–1553: Pedro de Meneses
1553: Pedro da Cunha
1553: João Rodriges Pereira
1553–1555: Martim Correia da Silva
1555–1557: Jorge Vieira
1557–1562: Fernão de Meneses
1562–1563: Miguel de Meneses, conde de Vila Real
1563–1564: Fernão de Meneses
1564–1565: Pedro da Cunha
1566–1567: Francisco Pereira
1567–1574: Manuel de Meneses e Noronha, duque de Vila Real
1574–1577: Diogo Lopes da França
1577–1578: Manuel de Meneses e Noronha, duque de Vila Real
1578–1580: Dionísio Pereira
1580–1586: Jorge Pessanha
1586–1591: Gil Annes da Costa
1591: Francisco de Andrade (interim)
1591–1594: Miguel Luís de Meneses, duque de Caminha
1594–1597: Mendo de Ledesma
1597–1601: Miguel Luís de Meneses, duque de Caminha
1602–1605: Afonso de Noronha
1605–1615: Miguel Luís de Meneses, duque de Caminha
1615–1622: Luís de Noronha e Meneses, conde de Vila Real
1623: Miguel Luís de Meneses, duque de Caminha (interim)
1623–1624: António da Costa Albuquerque
1624–1625: Fernando de Mascarenhas, conde de Torre 
1625: Gonçalo Correia Alcoforado (interim)
1625–1626: Miguel de Meneses, duque de Caminha
1627: Dinís de Mascarenhas de Lencastre (interim)
1627–1634: Jorge de Mendonça Pessanha
1634–1636: Bás Teles de Meneses
1637: Fernão Teles de Meneses (interim)
1637–1640: Francisco de Almeida

Spanish Governors

1640–1641: Francisco de Almeida (interim)
1641–1644: Juan Fernández de Córdoba y Coalla, marqués de Miranda de Auta
1645–1646: Luis de Lencastre, marqués de Malagón
1646–1653: Juan Suárez de Alarcón y Melo (from 1652 marqués de Trocifal [Turcifal]) 
1653–1661: José Fernández de Sotomayor y Lima, marqués de Tenorio
1661–1665: Jerónimo de Noronha, marqués de Castelo Mendo
1665–1670: Pedro da Cunha, marqués de Sentar
1670–1677: Francisco Suárez de Alarcón, conde de Torres Vedras
1677: Antonio de Medina Chacón y Ponce de León (interim)
1677–1678: Diego de Portugal
1678–1679: Antonio de Medina Chacón y Ponce de León
1679–1681: Juan Arias-Dávila Pacheco y Téllez-Girón, conde de Puñonrostro
1681–1689: Francisco Baltasar de Velasco y Tovar, marqués de Berlanga
1689–1692: Francisco Bernardo Varona
1692–1695: Sebastián González de Andía y Irarrazábal Álvarez de Toldeo and Enríquez de Guzman, marqués de Valparaíso
1695–1698: Melchor de Avellaneda Sandoval y Rojas, marqués de Valdecañas
1698–1702: Francisco del Castillo Fajardo, marqués de Villadarias
1702: Antonio de Zuñiga y la Cerda (interim)
1702–1704: José de Agulló y de Pinós, marqués de Gironella
1705–1709: Juan Francisco Manrique de Arana y de Iraola
1709–1715: Gonzalo Chacón y Orellana Mendoza de Toledo Sandoval y Rojas
1715–1719: Francisco Fernández de Ribadeo
1719: Francisco Pérez Manchego (interim)
1719–1720: Luis Rigio, príncipe de Campo Florido
1720: Juan Francisco Manrique de Arana y de Iraola (interim)
1720–1725: Francisco Fernández de Ribadeo
1725–1731: Manuel Luis de Orleáns, conde de Charny
1731–1738: Álvaro de Navia Osorio y Vigil, marqués de Santa Cruz de Marcenado 
1738–1739: Antonio Manso y Maldonado
1739–1745: Pedro de Vargas Maldonado López de Carrizosa y Perea, marqués de Campofuerte
1745: Juan Antonio Tineo y Fuertes (interim)
1745–1746: Juan José de Palafox y Centurión
1746–1751: José Orcasitas y Oleaga
1751: Pedro Olaisa, marqués de la Matilla (interim)
1751–1754: Carlos Francisco de Croix, marqués de Croix
1754: Juan Urbina (interim)
1754–1759: Miguel Agustín Carreño
1759–1760: José Sant Just
1760–1763: Juan Wanmarch Lumen de la Vice, marqués de Wanmarch (Warmack)
1763: Diego de Noboa y Villamarin (interim)
1763–1766: Diego María de Osorio
1766: Diego de Noboa y Villamarin (interim)
1766–1770: Francisco Antonio Tineo, marqués de Casa Tremañes
1770: Diego Soler (interim)
1770–1783: Domingo Joaquín de Salcedo y Castellanos
1783–1784: Antonio Maria Imhofh
1784–1788: Miguel Porcel y Manrique de Arana, conde de las Lomas
1788–1792: José de Sotomayor y Echevarría 
1792–1793: José de Urrutia y las Casas
1793–1794: Juan de Basencourt
1794: Miguel Álvarez de Sotomayor y Flores, conde de Santa Clara (interim)
1794: Diego de la Peña (interim)
1794–1798: José Vasallo
1798: Ramon de Navas (interim)
1798–1801: Juan Bautista de Castro
1801–1805: Antonio Ferrero
1805: Ramon de Navas (interim)
1805: José de Alpudia y Valdés (interim)
1805–1807: Francisco de Orta y Arcos
1807–1808: Ramón de Carvajal
1808: Manuel de Clairac (interim)
1808–1809: Carlos Luján (interim)
1809–1810: Francisco Carlos Gabriel de Gand-Vialin, vizconde de Gand   
1810–1813: Sir John Fraser (British commandant)
1810–1813: Jose María de Alós
1813–1814: Charles Griffiths (British commandant)
1813: José María Lastres y Mora (interim)
1813: Francisco Carlos Gabriel de Gand-Vialin, vizconde de Gand   
1813: Pedro Grimarest (acting)
1813: Andres Mendoza (interim)
1813–1814: Fernando Gómez de Butrón
1814–1815: Pedro Grimarest
1815: Francisco Antonio de Villar y Herrera (interim)
1815–1816: Luis Antonio Flores
1816: Francisco Antonio de Villar y Herrera (interim)
1816–1818: Juan de Potons y Morica
1818: Francisco Antonio de Villar y Herrera (interim)
1818–1819: José Miranda
1819: Pablo Menacho (interim)
1819–1820: Vicente Rosique (interim)
1820: Francisco Antonio de Villar y Herrera (interim)
1820–1822: Fernando Gómez de Butrón
1822–1823: Álvaro María Chacón
1823: Manuel Fernández (interim)
1823: Antonio Quiroga (interim)
1823: Francisco Antonio de Villar y Herrera (interim)
1823–1824: Juan María Muñoz
1824–1826: José Miranda  
1826: Joaquín Bureau (interim)
1826: Julio O'Neil (interim)
1826–1831: Juan María Muñoz
1831: Juan Cortés (interim)
1831–1832: Carlos Ullmann
1832–1833: Francisco de Haro
1833–1835: Mateo Ramírez de Arellano
1835: Pablo Valiñán (interim)
1835: Carlos Espinosa (interim)
1835: Jose Villamil (interim)
1835–1836: Joaquín Gómez y Ansa
1836–1837: Francisco Sanjuanena
1837: Pedro Valiñán (interim)
1837: Bernardo Tacón (interim)
1837–1844: José María Rodríguez de Vera
1844: Francisco de Paula Warleta
1844: Juan Prim y Prats (interim)
1844: Antonio Marui (interim)
1844–1848: Antonio Ordoñez

Governors (also Governors-general of the Captaincy-General of North Africa)

1848–1850: Antonio Ros de Olano
1850: Trinidad Balboa (interim)
1851–1853: Cayetano Urbin
1853–1854: Joaquin Aguando
1854–1857: Mariano Rebagliato y Pescetto
1857–1858: Carlos Tolrá y Marsilla
1858–1859: Manuel Gasset y Mercader
1859–1864: Ramón Gómez Pulido
1864–1865: Manuel Álvarez Maldonado
1865–1866: Ramón Gómez Pulido
1866: Antonio Peláez Campomanes (interim)
1866–1868: José Orive Sanz
1868: Antonio del Rey y Caballero (interim)
1868–1870: Joaquín Cristón y Gasatín
1870–1872: Enrique Serrano y Dolz
1872–1873: Carlos Sáenz y Delcourt
1873: Manuel Keller y García
1873–1875: Fulgencio Gavilá y Solá
1875–1876: Pedro Sartorius y Tapia
1876–1877: Fernando del Pino y Villamil
1877: Juan García Torres
1877–1878: Victoriano López Pinto
1878–1879: José María Velasco Postigo
1879–1881: José Aizpurúa y Lorries Fontecha
1881–1883: José Merelo y Calvo
1883: José Pascual de Bonanza y Soler
1883–1889: José López Pinto y Marín-Reina
1889–1891: Narciso de Fuentes y Sánchez
1891–1894: Miguel Correa y García
1894–189.: Rafael Correa y García
189.–1901: Jacinto de León y Barreda
1901–1903: Manuel de Aguilar y Diosdado
1903–1907: Francisco Fernández Bernal
1907–1908: Fernando Álvarez de Sotomayor y Flóres
1908–1910: José García Aldave y Mancebo
1910–1912: Felipe Alfau y Mendoza

Mayors (Alcaldes)

1912–1913: José Alvarez Sanz
1913–1914: José Trujillo Zafra
1914: Restituto Palacios Garrido
1914–1915: Demetrio Guillén Conde
1915–1917: José Trujillo Zafra
1917–1918: Baldomero Blond Llanos
1918–1919: Joaquín García de la Torre y Almenara
1919–1923: Isidoro Martínez Durán

Chairmen of the Civic-Military Municipal Junta

1923–1927: Agustin Gómez Morato
1927: José García Benítez
1927–1931: José Rosende Martín

Mayors (Alcaldes)

1923: Demetrio Casares Vázquez
1923: Eduardo Álvarez Ardanuy
1923–1924: Remigio González Lozana
1924–1926: Ricardo Rodríguez Macedo
1926–1927: Manuel Matres Toril
1927–1928: José García Benítez
1928–1931: José Rosende Martín
1931: Antonio López Sánchez-Prado
1931: Manuel Olivencia Amor
1931–1932: Eduardo Pérez Ortiz    
1932–1933: David Valverde Soriano 
1933–1936: José Victori Goñalons  
1936: Antonio López Sánchez-Prado
1936–1937: José Tejero Ruiz
1937–1940: Fernando López-Cantí y Sánchez
1940–1941: Jacinto Ochoa Ochoa 
1941–1944: José Vidal Fernández 
1944–1946: Francisco Ruiz Sánchez
1946–1950: José Rojas Feigenspan 
1950: Francisco López Bravo
1950–1957: Vicente García Arrazola
1957–1961: Francisco Ruiz Sánchez
1961–1967: Alberto Ibañez Trujillo
1967–1972: José Zurrón Rodríguez
1972–1978: Alfonso Sotelo Azorín 
1978–1979: Ricardo Muñoz Rodriguez
1979: Eduardo Hernández Lobillo
1979–1981: Clemente Calvo Pecino
1981–1983: Ricardo Muñoz Rodríguez
1983–1985: Francisco Fraiz Armada
1985–1987: Aurelio Puya Rivas
1987–1991: Fructuoso Miaja Sánchez
1991–1994: Francisco Fraiz Armada
1994–1995: Basilio Fernández López

For continuation after 1995, see: Mayor-President of Ceuta

Sources
World Statesmen.org
 

Ceuta-related lists
Politics of Ceuta
Ceuta
Ceuta